The Brainard Shale is a geologic formation in Illinois. It preserves fossils dating back to the Ordovician period.

See also
 List of fossiliferous stratigraphic units in Illinois

References

 

Ordovician Iowa
Ordovician Illinois